The 1988 Family Circle Cup was a women's tennis tournament played on outdoor clay courts at the Sea Pines Plantation on Hilton Head Island, South Carolina in the United States and was part of the Category 5 tier of the 1988 WTA Tour. It was the 16th edition of the tournament and ran from April 4 through April 10, 1988. First-seeded Martina Navratilova won the singles title.

Finals

Singles

 Martina Navratilova defeated  Gabriela Sabatini 6–1, 4–6, 6–4
 It was Navratilova's 4th singles title of the year and the 133rd of her career.

Doubles

 Lori McNeil /  Martina Navratilova defeated  Claudia Kohde-Kilsch /  Gabriela Sabatini 6–2, 2–6, 6–3
 It was McNeil's 3rd doubles title of the year and the 13th of her career. It was Navratilova's 4th doubles title of the year and the 139th of her career.

References

External links
 Official website
 ITF tournament edition details

Family Circle Cup
Charleston Open
Family Circle Cup
Family Circle Cup
Family Circle Cup